Del mio meglio n. 5 is a compilation album by Italian singer Mina released in May 1979.

The album
The album contains tracks previously by Mina between the 1972 album Altro and the 1977 album Mina con bignè.
The version of L'abitudine (Daddy's Dream) on this compilation is the alternate version to the same title on the album Mina con bignè (1977).This is the first compilation disc to contain this alternate version.

Track listing

Musicians

Artists
 Mina- voice

Arrangement and orchestra director
 Enrico Riccardi: Track 1
 Tony Mimms: Track 2
 Gianni Ferrio: Track 3, 8, 9, 11
 Pino Presti: Track 4, 7, 10
 Carlo Pes / Pino Presti: Track 5, 12
 Massimo Salerno: Track 6
 Sound engineer: Nuccio Rinaldis

References

1979 albums
Mina (Italian singer) albums
Albums conducted by Pino Presti
Albums arranged by Pino Presti